Arthur Everitt (27 August 1872 – 10 January 1952) was a British fencer. He won a silver medal in the team épée event at the 1912 Summer Olympics.

References

1872 births
1952 deaths
British male fencers
Olympic fencers of Great Britain
Fencers at the 1912 Summer Olympics
Olympic silver medallists for Great Britain
Olympic medalists in fencing
People from Paddington
Medalists at the 1912 Summer Olympics
Sportspeople from London